= After Earth (band) =

American heavy metal band (2011–2016)

- Origin: Upstate New York
- Genres: Heavy Metal
- Years active: 2011–2016
- Past members: Damon Koscinski; Greg Metcalf; Anthony Hirsch; Sal Piazza; Luciano Capelli; Mike Judkins; William Perkins

After Earth is an American heavy metal band from Upstate New York formed in July 2011. After Earth released their first EP, The Henchmen, in February 2013 and their first full-length studio album, Æternal, On November 25, 2015.

== Members ==
=== Current ===
- Damon Koscinski (2011–Present)
- AJ Hirsch - Drums (2017–Present)
- TBA - Guitar
- TBA - Guitar
- William Perkins- Bass (2011–Present)

=== Former ===
- Mike Judkins - Guitar (2012-2016)
- Greg Metcalf- Guitar (2012-2014)
- Anthony Hirsch- Drums (2011-2013)
- Sal Piazza - Drums (2013-2016)
- Luciano Cappelli - Guitar (2013-2016)

== Departure of Damon ==
On July 10, 2016 at 1:25pm, the lead vocalist, Damon Koscinski, announced on his personal Facebook page that he will no longer be a part of After Earth. The post stated "I have an announcement to make. As of right now effective immediately I am NO longer the front man for After Earth. I have decided to take my life in another direction and pursue something else. Thank you all for the countless awesome years! #ÆArmy I love you all!" The same day at 6:24pm, there was a post made on the official band page about the situation stating "At this time, our vocalist Damon is going through a tough time at home and he has decided to step down from After Earth. We understand what he is going through and wish him the best of luck with his healing. This does not mean the end of Æ. We will continue on and hope that Damon comes around, fixes his demons, and returns back to us. Thank you all so much for the support. #AfterEarth #ÆARMY"

== Discography ==
=== EP ===
Title	Album details
The Henchmen (EP)	Release Date : February 2014; Label: BMI; Formats: CD, digital download

=== Studio Album ===
Title	Album details
Æternal	Release Date: November 25, 2015; Label: BMI; Formats: CD, Digital download

=== Singles ===
Title	Year	Album
"The Henchman"	2013	The Henchmen (EP)

== Awards ==
=== Sammys ===
Year	Nominee / work	Award	Result
2016	Æternal	Best Hard Rock Recording	Won
